The 1360s in music involved some significant events.

Events 

1361
The Dauphin of France (the future Charles V) is a guest in the house of Guillaume de Machaut in Reims.
Francesco Landini is appointed organist at the monastery of Santa Trinita in Florence.
1362 –
 Niccolò da Perugia and Gherardello da Firenze visit the monastery of Santa Trinita in Florence.
The first documented use of polyphony in Brussels, at the collegiate church of Ste Gudule.

Compositions 
1360
January – Two motets by Guillaume de Machaut, No. 21 Veni, creator spiritus and No. 23 Inviolata genitrix, are composed in response to the Siege of Reims.
 after 1360 – Guillaume de Machaut motet No. 21 "Plange, regni respublica / Tu qui gregem tuum ducis / Apprehende arma et scutum et exurge"
1365 – Guillaume de Machaut's Messe de Nostre Dame had been composed by this year.
 1369 – Johannes Vaillant's double-texted (ballade) for three voices, Dame doucement trait / Doulz amis de cuer parfait, was copied in Paris (compilatum fuit parisius) into the Chantilly Codex (fol. 26v), and thus likely was composed in that year.
unknown – Guillaume de Machaut – David Hoquetus

Births

Deaths 
 1361 – 
?May – Lodewijk Heyligen, Franco-Flemish music theorist. 
 9 June – Philippe de Vitry, French composer.

References

 
14th century in music